Helicodontidae is a family of air-breathing land snails, terrestrial pulmonate gastropod mollusks in the superfamily Helicoidea  (according to the taxonomy of the Gastropoda by Bouchet & Rocroi, 2005).

Subfamilies and genera 
There are two subfamilies in the family Helicodontidae.

The type genus is Helicodonta Férussac, 1821.

 subfamily Helicodontinae Kobelt, 1904 - synonym: Gonostomatinae Kobelt, 1904, Drepanostomatini Schileyko, 1991
 Atenia Gittenberger, 1968
 Darderia Altaba, 2006
 Drepanostoma Porro, 1836
 Falkneria H. Nordsieck, 1989
 Helicodonta Férussac, 1821
 Soosia Hesse, 1918
 subfamily Lindholmiolinae Schileyko, 1978
Lindholmiola Hesse, 1931

References

External links